Číměř is a municipality and village in Jindřichův Hradec District in the South Bohemian Region of the Czech Republic. It has about 700 inhabitants.

Administrative parts
Villages of Bílá, Dobrá Voda, Lhota, Nová Ves, Potočná and Sedlo are administrative parts of Všemyslice.

Gallery

References

Villages in Jindřichův Hradec District